Cheikh Tidiane Sarr (born 15 March 1987) is a Danish former professional footballer of Senegalese descent. He last worked as a coach of Landskrona BoIS U19.

Playing career
Sarr progressed through the youth teams of Lyngby before joining Ligue 1 club Bordeaux in 2003. He returned to Lyngby after two years, where he made his professional debut in a 6–2 win in the Danish Cup over Taastrup FC on 9 August 2005.

On 28 November 2005, Sarr signed a four-year contract with Danish Superliga club AGF. He made his debut in the top tier on 11 March 2006, starting in a 1–1 home draw against SønderjyskE.

Sarr terminated his contract with AGF by mutual consent on 8 January 2009, after losing his spot in the first team. He returned to his former club Lyngby the same day, signing a two-and-a-half-year deal with the club.

He signed a short-term contract with the Stockholm-based club Hammarby IF, on 22 August 2011, after his release from Lyngby. He made his debut for the club on 4 September, coming off the bench for David Lidholm in the 63rd minute in a 3–2 away loss in Superettan to Degerfors IF.

After less than a season with Hammarby, Sarr returned to Denmark where he played for Brønshøj in the spring of 2012. In August 2012, Sarr joined FK Jerv, debuting in the Norwegian Second Division on 1 September in a 1–1 home draw against FK Vidar. He played for Jerv for the remainder of 2012, where he left the club as a free agent. After nine months without a club, and trials in Norway, Sweden and the Faroe Islands, Sarr returned to Brønshøj on 26 September 2013.

In February 2014, Sarr joined Landskrona BoIS on a six-month deal. He played two years for the club, before moving to Höganäs BK in December 2015 in Division 2, the fourth tier of Swedish football.

Coaching career
On 1 November 2017, Sarr was appointed coach of the under-19 team of Landskrona BoIS.

References

External links
 
 Cheikh Sarr on DanskFodbold
 Cheikh Sarr on Landskrona BoIS

1987 births
Living people
Danish people of Senegalese descent
Danish men's footballers
Denmark youth international footballers
Lyngby Boldklub players
FC Girondins de Bordeaux players
Aarhus Gymnastikforening players
Hammarby Fotboll players
Brønshøj Boldklub players
FK Jerv players
Landskrona BoIS players
Danish Superliga players
Danish 1st Division players
Danish 2nd Division players
Norwegian Second Division players
Superettan players
Ettan Fotboll players
Division 2 (Swedish football) players
Danish expatriate men's footballers
Expatriate footballers in France
Danish expatriate sportspeople in France
Danish expatriate sportspeople in Sweden
Expatriate footballers in Sweden
Danish expatriate sportspeople in Norway
Expatriate footballers in Norway
Association football defenders
Footballers from Copenhagen